Chris De Craene is a Belgian paralympic athlete, and para swimmer. She competed at the 1980, 1984, 1988 and 1992 Summer Paralympics. She won three medals, one silver and two bronze.

Career 
At the 1980 Summer Paralympics in Arnhem, she competed in Women's 100 meters Freestyle 4, Women's 100 m Backstroke 4, and Women's 100 m Breaststroke 4.

At the 1984 Summer Paralympics in New York, she won a silver medal in Women's 400 meters 4, and bronze medal in Women's 200 meters 4.

At the 1988 Summer Paralympics in Seoul, she won a bronze medal in Women's 5000 meters 4, She competed in Women's 800 meters 4, finishing fifth.

At the 1992 Summer Paralympics in Barcelona .she competed in the Women's 100 meters TW4, Women's 200 meters TW4, and Women's 400 meters TW4.

References 

Living people
Paralympic athletes of Belgium
Paralympic swimmers of Belgium
Belgian female wheelchair racers
Belgian female freestyle swimmers
Belgian female backstroke swimmers
Belgian female breaststroke swimmers
Swimmers at the 1980 Summer Paralympics
Athletes (track and field) at the 1984 Summer Paralympics
Athletes (track and field) at the 1988 Summer Paralympics
Athletes (track and field) at the 1992 Summer Paralympics
Medalists at the 1984 Summer Paralympics
Medalists at the 1988 Summer Paralympics
Paralympic silver medalists for Belgium
Paralympic bronze medalists for Belgium
Year of birth missing (living people)